National Secondary Route 202, or just Route 202 (or ) is a National Road Route of Costa Rica, located in the San José, Cartago provinces.

Description
In San José province the route covers Montes de Oca canton (San Pedro, Sabanilla, Mercedes, San Rafael districts).

In Cartago province the route covers La Unión canton (Tres Ríos, Concepción, Dulce Nombre, San Ramón districts).

References

Highways in Costa Rica